Mountain View School District may refer to:

 Mountain View School District (Arkansas), Mountain View, Arkansas
 Mountain View School District (Los Angeles County, California), a public school district based in Los Angeles County, California, United States 
 Mountain View School District (San Bernardino County, California)
 Mountain View School District (Idaho)
 Mountain View School District (Pennsylvania), Susquehanna County, Pennsylvania